The Municipality of Kozje is a municipality in the traditional region of Styria in northeastern Slovenia. The seat of the municipality is the town of Kozje. Kozje became a municipality in 1994.

Settlements
In addition to the municipal seat of Kozje, the municipality also includes the settlements of Bistrica, Buče, Dobležiče, Drensko Rebro, Gorjane, Gradišče, Gubno, Ješovec pri Kozjem, Klake, Lesično, Ortnice, Osredek pri Podsredi, Pilštanj, Podsreda, Poklek pri Podsredi, Topolovo, Vetrnik, Vojsko, Vrenska Gorca, Zagorje, Zdole, and Zeče pri Bučah.

References

External links

Municipality of Kozje on Geopedia
Kozje municipal site

Kozje
1994 establishments in Slovenia